Néstor José Merlo (born 31 July 1960 in Buenos Aires) is a retired Argentine football goalkeeper.

Merlo began his playing career in 1983 in the Argentine 2nd division with Deportivo Español, he joined Arsenal de Sarandí in 1984 and then Chaco For Ever in 1986.

In 1988 Merlo was signed by Boca Juniors of the Primera División but he only ever played two games for the club in the Copa Libertadores before returning to Chaco For Ever after their promotion to the Primera in 1989.

Between 1990 and 1993 he played for Estudiantes de La Plata before returning to the 2nd division where he played for Quilmes, Chacarita Juniors and Aldosivi. His last club was San Martín de Burzaco of Primera C Metropolitana between 2001 and 2002. Over his career he played a total of 3550 league games for eight different clubs.

References

External links
 BDFA profile
Profile at worldcupmasters.com

Footballers from Buenos Aires
Argentine footballers
Association football goalkeepers
Deportivo Español footballers
Arsenal de Sarandí footballers
Boca Juniors footballers
Estudiantes de La Plata footballers
Quilmes Atlético Club footballers
Chacarita Juniors footballers
Aldosivi footballers
Argentine Primera División players
1960 births
Living people